Samantha Arnaudo (born 22 May 1993) is an Italian professional racing cyclist, who most recently rode for UCI Women's Continental Team .

References

External links
 

1993 births
Living people
Italian female cyclists
Place of birth missing (living people)
People from Savigliano
Cyclists from Piedmont
Sportspeople from the Province of Cuneo
21st-century Italian women